Austria-Forum is a freely accessible online collection of reference works in both German and English about Austria-related topics.

Background

The predecessor of Austria-Forum, the AEIOU project was launched in 1996 by the Austrian Federal Ministry for Science and Research as part of Austria's millennial celebrations. The first mention of the name Ostarrîchi, or Austria was in the year 996. The content was based on the German-language Österreich-Lexikon, first published in a printed version in 1995. Additional material was acquired, including more images and also audio and video files, and AEIOU soon grew into a multimedia information system.

The title AEIOU—the "Annotatable Electronic Interactive Oesterreich Universal Information System"—is an allusion to the old Habsburg motto, A.E.I.O.U. Suggestions for the improvements to articles can be made by reader; however, the aeiou Encyclopedia was not a wiki.

See also 
 List of online encyclopedias

References

External links
  

Austrian culture
Austrian online encyclopedias
Multilingual websites